Jonadel is a cultivar of apple which was raised in 1923 at the Iowa Agricultural Experiment Station, Ames, Iowa, United States, a cross between the Jonathan and the Red Delicious. It was introduced in 1958.

Jonadel has a green-yellow basic color with a streaked orange covering color.

External links

Apple cultivars with patented mutants
American apples
Apple cultivars